Aparai or Apalai may refer to:
 Aparai people, an ethnic group of Brazil
 Apalaí language, a language of Brazil
 , a place in Molėtai District Municipality, Lithuania

Language and nationality disambiguation pages